The Saharenana River is located in northern Madagascar and crosses the Route Nationale 6 near Antananandrenitelo. Its sources are situated near Joffreville in the Ambohitra Massif and flows into the Indian Ocean.

References 
 Monographie de la Région Diana (on page 13)

Rivers of Diana Region
Rivers of Madagascar